Bouchercon is an annual convention of creators and devotees of mystery and detective fiction. It is named in honour of writer, reviewer, and editor Anthony Boucher; also the inspiration for the Anthony Awards, which have been issued at the convention since 1986. This page details Bouchercon XXXV and the 19th Anthony Awards ceremony.

Bouchercon
The convention was held in Toronto, Ontario, Canada on October 7, 2004; running until the 10th. The event was chaired by Al Navis, owner of the Toronto-based mystery book-store, Handy Book Exchange.

Special Guests
Lifetime Achievement award — Bernard Cornwell
Canadian Guest of Honor — Peter Robinson
British Guest of Honor — Lindsey Davis
American Guest of Honor — Jeremiah Healy
Fan Guest of Honor — Gary Warren Niebuhr
Toast mistress — Natasha Cooper

Anthony Awards
The following list details the awards distributed at the nineteenth annual Anthony Awards ceremony.

Novel award
Winner:
Laura Lippman, Every Secret Thing

Shortlist:
Giles Blunt, The Delicate Storm
Steve Hamilton, Blood is the Sky
Dennis Lehane, Shutter Island
Peter Robinson, The Summer that Never Was

First novel award
Winner:
P. J. Tracy, Monkeewrench

Shortlist:
Erin Hart, Haunted Ground
Rebecca Pawel, Death of a Nationalist
Lono Waiwaiole, Wiley's Lament
Jacqueline Winspear, Maisie Dobbs

Paperback original award
Winner:
Robin Burcell, Deadly Legacy

Shortlist:
Elaine Flinn, Dealing in Murder
P. J. Parrish, Thicker than Water
Jason Starr, Tough Luck
Sylvia Maultash Warsh, Find Me Again

Short story award
Winner:
Rhys Bowen, "Doppelganger", from Blood on their Hands

Shortlist:
Sandy Balzo, "The Grass is Always Greener", from Ellery Queen's Mystery Magazine March 2003
Jack Bludis, "Munchies", from Hardbroiled
Eddie Muller, "Wanda Wilcox is "Trapped!"", from Plots With Guns September / October 2003
Elaine Viets, "Red Meat", from Blood on their Hands

Critical / Non-fiction award
Winner:
Gary Warren Niebuhr, Make Mine a Mystery: A Reader's Guide to Mystery and Detective Fiction

Shortlist:
Colleen Barnett, Mystery Women: An Encyclopedia of Leading Women Characters in Mystery Fiction, Vol III
Jane Doe, The Story of Jane Doe: A Book about Rape
Jon Jordan, Interrogations
Andrew Wilson, Beautiful Shadow: A Life of Patricia Highsmith

Young adult award
Winner:
J. K. Rowling, Harry Potter and the Order of the Phoenix

Shortlist:
Eoin Colfer, Artemis Fowl: The Eternity Code
Bridget Crowley, Feast of Fools
Kathleen Karr, Seventh Knot
Norah McClintock, No Escape

Historical mystery award
Winner:
Rhys Bowen, For the Love of Mike

Shortlist:
Maureen Jennings, Let Loose the Dogs
Olen Steinhauer, The Bridge of Sighs
Sylvia Maultash Warsh, Find Me Again
Jacqueline Winspear, Maisie Dobbs

Fan publication award
Winner:
Kate Stine, Mystery Scene Magazine

Shortlist:
George Easter, Deadly Pleasures
Jim Huang, The Drood Review of Mystery
Lynn Kaczmarek & Chris Aldrich, Mystery News
Janet Rudolph, Mystery Readers Journal

References

Anthony Awards
35
2004 in Toronto